Comber is a civil parish in County Down, Northern Ireland. It is mainly situated in the historic barony of Castlereagh Lower, with a small portion in the barony of Castlereagh Upper.

Settlements
Settlements within Comber civil parish include:
Ballygowan (partly in civil parish of Killinchy)
Comber
Moneyreagh
Cherryvalley

Townlands
Comber civil parish contains the following 43 townlands:
(Most of the 43 townlands are in the barony of Castlereagh Lower, but 2 townlands (Clontonakelly and Crossnacreevy) are in the barony of Castlereagh Upper.)

Ballyalloly
Ballyaltikilligan
Ballyalton
Ballybeen
Ballycreelly
Ballygowan
Ballyhanwood
Ballyhenry Major
Ballyhenry Minor
Ballykeel
Ballyloughan
Ballymagaughey
Ballymaglaff
Ballymalady
Ballynichol
Ballyrickard
Ballyrush
Ballyrussell
Ballystockart
Ballywilliam
Carnasure
Castleaverry
Cattogs
Cherryvalley
Clontonakelly
Crossnacreevy
Cullintraw
Edenslate
Glassmoss
Gransha
Killynether
Lisleen
Longlands
Magherascouse
Moneyreagh
Monlough
Mount Alexander
Ringcreevy
Rough Island
Town Parks
Trooperfield
Tullygarvan
Tullyhubbert

See also
List of civil parishes of County Down

References